Personal Reflections is the eleventh studio album by Freddie Jackson. It was released by Artemis Records on November 1, 2005 in the United States. A covers project, it comprises renditions of original songs by Paul Davis, Captain & Tennille, and others.

Critical reception

Allmusic editor Rob Theakston found that with Personal Reflections "Jackson reminds everyone why he was such a potent force in the great quiet storm invasion of the '80s, and why his name belongs up there with some of the style's most well-known artists [...]Jackson never strays too far from the course, thankfully doesn't attempt to demonstrate vocal acrobatics whenever there's a free space of music, and somehow manages to make one of AM pop's most treasured songs sound like it was custom written for him, all within a reasonable and unbloated running time of 40 minutes. It's a solid statement that's filler-free, and one of his best works in over a decade."

Track listing

References

External links

 Personal Reflections at Discogs

2005 albums
Freddie Jackson albums